Edward Colebrooke may refer to:

 Edward Colebrooke, 1st Baron Colebrooke (1861–1939), British Liberal politician and courtier
 Sir Edward Colebrooke, 4th Baronet (1813–1890), British politician
 Edward Colebrooke (cricketer), English cricketer